Nealcidion murinum is a species of beetle in the family Cerambycidae. It was described by Monné in 1998.

References

Nealcidion
Beetles described in 1998